The Arizona State Law Journal is a quarterly student-edited law review covering the law and law-related topics published at the Sandra Day O'Connor College of Law. It was established in 1969 as Law and the Social Order, obtaining its current title in 1974. In the period from 2008 to 2015, the journal was the 66th most-cited law review by American courts and the ninety-fifth cited journal by other law reviews.

See also
List of law journals

References

External links

American law journals
Arizona State University publications
English-language journals
Quarterly journals
Publications established in 1969
General law journals